Dateline Nigeria is a private online newspaper published by StoryLand Media based in FCT Abuja that published English Language daily news. The paper is managed by Nasiru Lawal Abubakar as the editor and Lawan Danjuma Adamu, who was the pioneer Weekend Editor overseeing both Weekend Titles – Daily Trust on Saturday and Daily Trust on Sunday as the General Editor Both of them resigned from Daily Trust in 2020.

History
The paper was started by Fateema B. Bello in November 2019, as a platform for Credible News and Robust Views. Mrs Bello added that "the two editors will help to actualize and strengthen the news platform’s goals of providing deep investigative stories, factual and balanced reports and in-depth analyses to its readers."

The paper's mission is to promote freedom of speech, ease access to information and promote Nigeria's global image. Dateline Nigeria's main target audience is the youths, business and political class, students and the affluent, the educated and the upwardly mobile.

Dateline Nigeria covers topics such as politics, business and economy, entertainment news from Kannywood, Nollywood, sports, arts and culture.

The paper became popular after covering the plane crash involving Nigeria's for Chief of Army Staff, Ibrahim Attahiru. He died with his aides in a plane crash, which occurred near the Kaduna International Airport. It was raining heavily at the time of the crash.

References

External links
 Official Website

Nigerian news websites